Tetrops praeustus (frequently misspelled as "praeusta") is a small longhorn beetle found in Europe. It has recently been introduced in eastern North America.

External links

Tetropini
Beetles of Europe
Beetles described in 1758